Robert David Putnam (born 1941) is an American  political scientist specializing in comparative politics. He is the Peter and Isabel Malkin Professor of Public Policy at the Harvard University John F. Kennedy School of Government. Putnam developed the influential two-level game theory that assumes international agreements will only be successfully brokered if they also result in domestic benefits. His most famous (and controversial) work, Bowling Alone, argues that the United States has undergone an unprecedented collapse in civic, social, associational, and political life (social capital) since the 1960s, with serious negative consequences. In March 2015, he published a book called Our Kids: The American Dream in Crisis that looked at issues of inequality of opportunity in the United States. According to the Open Syllabus Project, Putnam is the fourth most frequently cited author on college syllabi for political science courses.

Background
Robert David Putnam was born on January 9, 1941, in Rochester, New York, and grew up in Port Clinton, Ohio, where he participated in a competitive bowling league as a teenager. Putnam graduated from Swarthmore College in 1963 where he was a member of Phi Sigma Kappa fraternity. An outstanding student, he won a Fulbright Fellowship to study at Balliol College, Oxford, and went on to earn a master's degree and doctorate from Yale University, the latter in 1970. He taught at the University of Michigan until joining the faculty at Harvard in 1979, where he has held a variety of positions, including Dean of the Kennedy School, and is currently the Malkin Professor of Public Policy. Putnam was raised as a religiously observant Methodist. In 1963, Putnam married his wife Rosemary, a special education teacher and French horn player. Around the time of his marriage, he converted to Judaism, his wife's religion.

Making Democracy Work
His first work in the area of social capital was Making Democracy Work: Civic Traditions in Modern Italy, a comparative study of regional governments in Italy that drew great scholarly attention for its argument that the success of democracies depends in large part on the horizontal bonds that make up social capital. Putnam writes that northern Italy's history of community, guilds, clubs, and choral societies led to greater civic involvement and greater economic prosperity. Meanwhile, the agrarian society of Southern Italy is less prosperous economically and democratically because of less social capital. Social capital, which Putnam defines as "networks and norms of civic engagement", allows members of a community to trust one another. When community members trust one another, trade, money-lending, and democracy flourish.

Putnam's finding that social capital has pro-democracy effects has been rebutted by a sizable literature which finds that civic associations have been associated with the rise of anti-democratic movements.

Bowling Alone

In 1995, he published "Bowling Alone: America's Declining Social Capital" in the Journal of Democracy. The article was widely read and garnered much attention for Putnam, including an invitation to meet with then-President Bill Clinton and a spot in the pages of People.

In 2000, he published Bowling Alone: The Collapse and Revival of American Community, a book-length expansion of the original argument, adding new evidence and answering many of his critics. Though he measured the decline of social capital with data of many varieties, his most striking point was that many traditional civic, social and fraternal organizations – typified by bowling leagues – had undergone a massive decline in membership while the number of people bowling had increased dramatically.

Putnam distinguishes two kinds of social capital: bonding capital and bridging capital. Bonding occurs among similar people (same age, same race, same religion, etc.), while bridging involves the same activities among dissimilar people.  He argues that peaceful multi-ethnic societies require both types. Putnam argues that those two kinds of social capital, bonding and bridging, do strengthen each other. Consequently, with the decline of the bonding capital mentioned above inevitably comes the decline of the bridging capital leading to greater ethnic tensions.

In 2016, Putnam explained his inspiration for the book, by saying,

Critics such as the sociologist Claude Fischer argue that (a) Putnam concentrates on organizational forms of social capital, and pays much less attention to networks of interpersonal social capital; (b) Putnam neglects the emergence of new forms of supportive organizations on and off the Internet; and (c) the 1960s are a misleading baseline because the era had an unusually high number of traditional organizations.

Since the publication of Bowling Alone, Putnam has worked on efforts to revive American social capital, notably through the Saguaro Seminar, a series of meetings among academics, civil society leaders, commentators, and politicians to discuss strategies to re-connect Americans with their communities. These resulted in the publication of the book and website, Better Together, which provides case studies of vibrant and new forms of social capital building in the United States

Social capital 
Putnam theorizes a relation in the negatives trends in society. He envisions a uniting factor named social capital; originally coined (no evidence provided) by social theorist Alexis de Tocqueville as a strength within America allowing democracy to thrive due to the closeness of society, "trends in civic engagement of a wider sort". Putnam observes a declining trend in social capital since the 1960s. The decreasing in social capital is blamed for rising rates in unhappiness as well as political apathy. Low social capital, a feeling of alienation within society is associated with additional consequences such as:
 Lower confidence in local government, local leaders and the local news media.
 Lower political efficacy – that is, confidence in one's own influence.
 Lower frequency of registering to vote, but more interest and knowledge about politics and more participation in protest marches and social reform groups.
 Higher political advocacy, but lower expectations that it will bring about a desirable result.
 Less expectation that others will cooperate to solve dilemmas of collective action (e.g., voluntary conservation to ease a water or energy shortage).
 Less likelihood of working on a community project.
 Less likelihood of giving to charity or volunteering.
 Fewer close friends and confidants.
 Less happiness and lower perceived quality of life.
 More time spent watching television and more agreement that "television is my most important form of entertainment".

Diversity and trust within communities

In recent years, Putnam has been engaged in a comprehensive study of the relationship between trust within communities and their ethnic diversity. His conclusion based on over 40 cases and 30,000 people within the United States is that in the short term, other things being equal, more diversity in a community is associated with less trust both among and within ethnic groups. Putnam describes people of all races, sex, socioeconomic statuses, and ages as "hunkering down", avoiding engagement with their local community as diversity increases. Although limited to American data, his findings run counter to contact hypothesis, which proposes that distrust declines as members of different ethnic groups interact, and conflict theory, which suggests that while distrust among ethnic groups rises with diversity, distrust within ethnic groups should decrease. Putnam found that even when controlling for income inequality and crime rates, two factors which conflict theory states should be prime causal factors in declining inter-ethnic group trust, more diversity is still associated with less communal trust. Further, he found that low communal trust is associated with the same consequences as low social capital. Putnam says, however, that "in the long run immigration and diversity are likely to have important cultural, economic, fiscal, and developmental benefits."

Putnam published his data set from this study in 2001 and subsequently published the full paper in 2007.

Putnam has been criticized for the lag between his initial study and his publication of his article. In 2006, Putnam was quoted in the Financial Times as saying he had delayed publishing the article until he could "develop proposals to compensate for the negative effects of diversity" (quote from John Lloyd of Financial Times). In 2007, writing in City Journal, John Leo questioned whether this suppression of publication was ethical behavior for a scholar, noting that "Academics aren't supposed to withhold negative data until they can suggest antidotes to their findings." On the other hand, Putnam did release the data in 2001 and publicized this fact.

Putnam denied allegations he was arguing against diversity in society and contended that his paper had been "twisted" to make a case against race-based admissions to universities. He asserted that his "extensive research and experience confirm the substantial benefits of diversity, including racial and ethnic diversity, to our society."

Recognition

Memberships and fellowships 
He has been a member of Phi Beta Kappa since 1963, the International Institute of Strategic Studies since 1986, the American Philosophical Society since 2005 and the National Academy of Sciences since 2001. He has been a Fellow of the American Academy of Arts and Sciences from 1980 and a Corresponding Fellow of the British Academy from 2001 and was a Fellow of the National Academy of Public Administration, 1989–2006 and Center for Advanced Study in the Behavioral Sciences, 1974–1975 and 1988–1989.  Other fellowships included the Guggenheim 1988–1989; the Woodrow Wilson International Center for Scholars 1977 and 1979; Fulbright 1964–1965 and 1977; SSRC-ACLS 1966–1968; Ford Foundation, 1970; German Marshall Fund, 1979; SSRC-Fulbright, 1982; SSRC-Foreign Policy Studies, 1988–1989 and was made a Harold Lasswell Fellow by the American Academy of Political and Social Science. Robert Putnam was a fellow of the Council on Foreign Relations 1977–1978 and a member since 1981. He was a member of the Trilateral Commission from 1990 to 1998. He was the President of the American Political Science Association (2001–2002). He had been Vice-President 1997–1998.

Awards 
In 2004 the President of the Italian Republic made him a Commander of the Order of the Star of Italian Solidarity. He was awarded the Johan Skytte Prize in Political Science in 2006 and a Wilbur Lucius Cross Medal by the Yale Graduate School of Arts and Sciences in 2003, he was a Marshall Lecturer at the University of Cambridge in 1999 and was honored with the Ithiel de Sola Pool Award and Lectureship of the American Political Science Association.

He has received honorary degrees from Stockholm University (in 1993), Ohio State University (2000), University of Antwerp (also 2000), University of Edinburgh (2003), Libera Università Internazionale degli Studi Sociali Guido Carli (2011), University of Oxford (2018), and University College London (2019).

In 2013, he was awarded the National Humanities Medal by President Barack Obama for "deepening our understanding of community in America."

In 2015, he was awarded the University of Bologna, ISA Medal for Science for research activities characterized by excellence and scientific value.

Published works

The Beliefs of Politicians: Ideology, Conflict, and Democracy in Britain and Italy New Haven: Yale University Press, (1973)
The Comparative Study of Political Elites Englewood Cliffs, New Jersey: Prentice-Hall, (1976)
Bureaucrats and Politicians in Western Democracies (with Joel D. Aberbach and Bert A. Rockman, 1981)
Hanging Together: Cooperation and Conflict in the Seven-Power Summits (with Nicholas Bayne, 1984; revised 1987)
  Staying together: the G8 summit confronts the 21st century. (2005, Aldershot, Hampshire, England: Ashgate Publishing.)
"Diplomacy and Domestic Politics: The Logic of Two-Level Games". International Organization. 42 (Summer 1988): 427–460.
Making Democracy Work: Civic Traditions in Modern Italy (with Robert Leonardi and Raffaella Nanetti, 1993)
Bowling Alone: The Collapse and Revival of American Community (2000) 
Democracies in Flux: The Evolution of Social Capital in Contemporary Society (Edited by Robert D. Putnam), Oxford University Press, (2002)
Better Together: Restoring the American Community (with Lewis M. Feldstein, 2003)

Interviews

See also
 Elite theory
 Putnam family

Notes

References

Further reading
 Utter, Glenn H.  and Charles Lockhart, eds. American Political Scientists: A Dictionary (2nd ed. 2002) pp 328–31,  online.

External links
Harvard Kennedy School homepage
Bio page at the Saguaro Seminar
Saguaro Seminar
Official website for Bowling Alone

Better Together, an initiative of the Saguaro Seminar
Subdivided: Isolation and Community in America Documentary Film featuring Robert Putnam Official website
"Bowling together", Interview with Robert Putnam by Rory Clarke in the OECD Observer, March 2004
"Our Kids Series", PBS Documentary Series Hosted by Dr. Robert Putnam, 2019
Skalicky, Michele.  "Filming Takes Place in Springfield for Documentary to Air Nationwide on PBS", KSMU, Ozarks, 26 April 2017. Retrieved on 31 January 2019.

1941 births
Academics of the University of Manchester
American non-fiction writers
American political scientists
Community building
Converts to Judaism from Methodism
Corresponding Fellows of the British Academy
Fellows of the American Academy of Arts and Sciences
Harvard University faculty
Jewish American writers
Living people
Members of the United States National Academy of Sciences
National Humanities Medal recipients
People from Port Clinton, Ohio
Scientists from Rochester, New York
Swarthmore College alumni
University of Michigan faculty
Writers from Rochester, New York
Yale University alumni
Members of the American Philosophical Society
21st-century American Jews
Fulbright alumni